Van den Herik is a Dutch toponymic surname. Notable people with the surname include:

Jorien van den Herik (born 1943), Dutch businessman
Rick Stuy van den Herik (born 1993), Dutch footballer
Yolanda Hadid (née van den Herik, born 1964), Dutch-American television personality, former model, and interior designer

Dutch-language surnames
Surnames of Dutch origin